Insignia of the Order of Canada are often donated or loaned to museums to be included in their displays about important Canadians.  Below is a list of known locations where these medals are displayed.

Alberta

Calgary

Manitoba

Winnipeg

Ontario 
Kitchener Ontario

Museum                                                            Person                       Rank                                                             Notes

Waterloo Regional Museum                      Henrietta McGarry            Commander                    Medal donated to Hall of Fame Collection for periodic display

London Ontario

Ottawa, Ontario

St. Mary's Ontario

Toronto Ontario

Trenton Ontario 

Leonard Birchall

Quebec

Laval

Gatineau

Quebec City 

Insignia
Canada-related lists